Nikolay Bauman  is a 1967 Soviet drama film directed by Semyon Tumanov.

Plot 
The film tells about the revolutionary Nikolay Bauman, one of the creators of the Iskra newspaper.

Cast 
 Rodion Aleksandrov as Zotov
 Elina Bystritskaya as Andreyeva
 Igor Dmitriev as Kachalov
 Yefim Kopelyan as Morozov
 Igor Ledogorov as Nikolay Bauman
 Irina Miroshnichenko as Nadya
 Sergey Nikonenko as Viktor
 Natalya Surovegina as Sasha
 Natalya Velichko as Nina
 Gennadiy Yukhtin as Kudryashov

References

External links 
 

1967 films
1960s Russian-language films
Soviet drama films
1967 drama films